{{DISPLAYTITLE:C28H42O2}}
The molecular formula C28H42O2 (molar mass: 410.63 g/mol, exact mass: 410.3185 u) may refer to:

 Tocotrienols
 β-Tocotrienol
 γ-Tocotrienol